Tim De Meersman (born 1 February 1985) is a Belgian professional footballer who plays as a midfielder.

Career
De Meersman was born in Dendermonde, and played youth football with Germinal Beerschot. After playing for Dutch clubs Vitesse and FC Eindhoven, in May 2008 he was linked with transfers to both ADO Den Haag and FC Dordrecht. He signed a two-year contract with ADO in June 2008, alongside Karim Soltani. He was released by the club in December 2008 (alongside Virgilio Texeira, Robin Faber and Samir El Moussaoui) after he failed to make a first-team appearance for them, and he returned to Belgium in June 2009 to sign with Dender, where he hoped to "re-launch" his career. After spending time with Sint-Niklaas, he signed for Dutch club HSV Hoek in January 2012. He later played in the Belgian lower leagues with KSV Bornem, FC Pepingen, Eendracht Zele and Ninove.

References

1985 births
Living people
People from Dendermonde
Belgian footballers
Beerschot A.C. players
SBV Vitesse players
FC Eindhoven players
ADO Den Haag players
F.C.V. Dender E.H. players
Sportkring Sint-Niklaas players
HSV Hoek players
K.F.C. Eendracht Zele players
Eredivisie players
Eerste Divisie players
Challenger Pro League players
Belgian Third Division players
Association football midfielders
K.V.K. Ninove players
Footballers from East Flanders